Good Earth State Park is a South Dakota State Park in Lincoln County, South Dakota in the United States along the Big Sioux River.  The park is open for year-round recreation including hiking. The park includes the Blood Run Site, a National Historic Landmark significant for its history as a settlement for thousands of Native Americans. A visitor center includes displays about the site's significance.

See also
List of South Dakota state parks

References

External links
 Good Earth State Park

Protected areas of Lincoln County, South Dakota
State parks of South Dakota